The Bureau of the Royal Household (BRH) is an agency of the monarchy of Thailand. In addition to a range of administrative and ceremonial responsibilities, the bureau also serves as a conduit for royal philanthropy.

The 2019 budget for the Bureau of the Royal Household was 6,800 million baht, up from 6,391.4 million baht in FY2018.

History

The history of the king's household pre-dates modern Thailand, links with the past are preserved. For example, the importance of "institutional memory" led to the appointment in the 1980s of a nonagenarian Khun Sawet Thunapradit as "Special Consultant to the Royal Household". From 2017, The Office of His Majesty's Principal Private Secretary falls under the direct supervision of Bureau of the Royal Household.
 
The agency's headquarters, headed by the Lord Chamberlain, is at Suan Amphon near Dusit Palace in Bangkok.

Palaces
The bureau is responsible for promoting and maintaining three different royal palaces:
 Grand Palace
 Dusit Palace
 Bang Pa-In Palace

Public relations
Some of the public relations of the monarchy are handled by officials of this bureau.  For example, during a period in which the king was quite ill, the bureau's official announcements provided information about the monarch's condition.

The BRH, through its Royal Ceremonial Division, is also responsible for organizing events related to the Royal Family of Thailand.

Finances
In 1932, assets of the royal family and household were seized. Much of it was restored after 1947.

The monarchy's household and finances are managed by the Bureau of the Royal Household and the Crown Property Bureau, respectively. They are quasi-government agencies of the Royal Thai Government with nominal cabinet representation on their respective governing boards but with the majority of personnel, in practice, being appointed by the palace.

References

Further reading
 Handley, Paul. (2006).  The King Never Smiles: a Biography of Thailand's Bhumibol Adulyadej. New Haven: Yale University Press. ;   OCLC 466622191
 Scigliano, Eric. (2002).   Love, War, and Circuses: the Age-old Relationship Between Elephants and Humans. Boston : Houghton Mifflin, 2002. ;   OCLC 49225866
 Library of Congress Country Studies, Thailand
 CIA World Factbook, Thailand

External links
 Bureau of the Royal Household

Thai monarchy
Royal agencies of Thailand
Royal households
Grand Palace
Monarchy and money